Andri Aganits (born 7 September 1993) is an Estonian volleyball player, a member of the Estonia men's national volleyball team and German club VfB Friedrichshafen.

Club career
Aganits played the 2020–21 season in Greek top club PAOK Thessaloniki.

Estonian national team
As a member of the senior Estonia men's national volleyball team, Aganits competed at the 2015, 2017, 2019 and 2021 Men's European Volleyball Championships.

Sporting achievements

Clubs
Baltic League
  2011/2012 – with Selver Tallinn

National championship
 2011/2012  Estonian Championship, with Selver Tallinn
 2012/2013  Estonian Championship, with Selver Tallinn
 2018/2019  Belgian Championship, with Noliko Maaseik
 2021/2022  German Championship, with VfB Friedrichshafen

National cup
 2011/2012  Estonian Cup, with Selver Tallinn
 2012/2013  Estonian Cup, with Selver Tallinn
 2018/2019  Belgian SuperCup, with Noliko Maaseik
 2019/2020  Belgian SuperCup, with Noliko Maaseik
 2021/2022  German Cup, with VfB Friedrichshafen

National team
 2016  European League
 2018  European League
 2018  Challenger Cup
 2021  European League

Individual
 2012 Young Estonian Volleyball Player of the Year
 2013 Baltic League – Best Blocker
 2018 European League – Best Middle Blocker

References

1993 births
Living people
Estonian men's volleyball players
Estonian expatriate volleyball players
Estonian expatriate sportspeople in Belgium
Estonian expatriate sportspeople in France
Estonian expatriate sportspeople in Germany
Estonian expatriate sportspeople in Italy
Expatriate volleyball players in Belgium
Expatriate volleyball players in France
Expatriate volleyball players in Germany
Expatriate volleyball players in Italy
People from Põlva
Estonian expatriate sportspeople in Greece
Expatriate volleyball players in Greece